Balwest (meaning Western mine) is a hamlet in the civil parish of Germoe in west Cornwall, England, in the United Kingdom.

The hamlet is on the southern edge of a former mining area, part of a geological formation known as the Tregonning-Godolphin Granite (one of five granite batholiths in Cornwall) which was formerly an important source of tin and copper ore (see also Geology of Cornwall).

A Wesleyan Methodist chapel was opened at Balwest in 1829 for miners. The building is Grade II listed.

References

Hamlets in Cornwall